is a former Japanese football player and manager. He played for Japan national team.

Club career
Komaeda was born in Iwate Prefecture on April 14, 1950. After graduating from Osaka University of Commerce, he joined Towa Real Estate (later Fujita Industries) in 1973. The club won the league champions in 1977, 1979 and 1981. The club also won 1977 and 1979 Emperor's Cup. He retired in 1982. He played 178 games and scored 18 goals in the league. He was selected Best Eleven 5 times.

National team career
On August 10, 1976, Komaeda debuted and scored 2 goals for Japan national team against Indonesia. He was also selected Japan in 1977. He played 2 games and scored 2 goals for Japan until 1977.

Coaching career
After retirement, Komaeda started coaching career at Fujita Industries (later Bellmare Hiratsuka). He was promoted to manager as Yoshinobu Ishii successor in 1990. In 1993, he led the club to won Japan Football League and promoted to J1 League. He managed the club until 1995. In August 1999, he became a manager again as Eiji Ueda successor. However, the club finished at bottom place and was relegated J2 League. He resigned a manager in 1999 and left club in 2000. In 2001, he moved to YKK and became a coach. In 2003, he became a manager.

National team statistics

Managerial statistics

References

External links
 
 Japan National Football Team Database

1950 births
Living people
Osaka University of Commerce alumni
Association football people from Iwate Prefecture
Japanese footballers
Japan international footballers
Japan Soccer League players
Shonan Bellmare players
Association football forwards
Association football midfielders
Japanese football managers
J1 League managers
Shonan Bellmare managers